The Loita Forest, also known as the Loita Naimina Enkiyio Forest or the Forest of the Lost Child, is an upland forest directly adjacent to the plains of the Masai Mara and the Great Rift Valley, Kenya.

The translation of "Forest of the Lost Child" is based on a Maasai legend about a young girl. According to the legend, the girl was taking care of some animal calves when some of them got loose and wandered into the forest. The girl went into the forest to find them. The calves eventually returned home without her. Family members and Maasai warriors marched through the forest to find her, but the girl never came out.

In popular culture

The forest was featured on an episode of The Wild Thornberrys which was called "Naimina Enkiyio." In the episode, three Maasai children tell Eliza Thornberry about the legend with further details, such as the existence of a monster who supposedly grabbed the young girl, dragged her to its hiding place and never let her go. They also spoke of the existence of a muddy pool that pulls the victim in and drowns them, and of the existence of giant warriors in the forest who pounce on their victims, kill them and then cannibalize them. However, the episode lists the location as Tanzania, not Kenya, though the Loita Forest itself is in Kenya.  However, Maasai Land is divided between the two countries, and the story of the Lost Girl ("Entito Naimina") or Lost Child ("Enkiyio Naimina") is well-known throughout all sections of Maasai Land.

Loita High School, the only secondary school in Entasekera Area and the entire Loita Division is also found in the big southern part of the Loita Forest. Jeremiah Ole Moonka is the school administrator.

References

Forests of Kenya